The 1948 World Table Tennis Championships men's singles was the 15th edition of the men's singles championship. 

Richard Bergmann defeated Bohumil Váňa in the final, winning three sets to two to secure the title.

Results

See also
List of World Table Tennis Championships medalists

References

-